Frank H. Pitts (born November 12, 1943) is a former professional American football wide receiver in the American Football League (AFL) and the National Football League (NFL). He played ten seasons for the AFL's Kansas City Chiefs (1965–1969) and then the NFL's Chiefs (1970), Cleveland Browns (1971–1973) and Oakland Raiders (1974).

Kansas City Chiefs
Pitts came to the Chiefs in 1965, the team's fourth-round draft pick. He had speed and desire, but throughout the wide receiver's first three seasons in Kansas City. he acquired a "bad hands" label.  However, he worked through the problem, and when starting wide receiver Otis Taylor was injured in 1968, Pitts stepped in. He was a starter the next three seasons, and his end around reverse runs became a big part of the Chiefs' offense.

Super Bowl IV
Hank Stram told the play to Chiefs quarterback Len Dawson. "Listen, let's have a ... 9-0-8, 51 G-O reverse." As Dawson ran back to the huddle, Stram told everyone on the sidelines, "Here comes the reverse from Tight I, it could be wide open." Dawson took the snap, faked to Wendell Hayes on the left side of the line, then turned the ball to a sprinting Frank Pitts, who turned the corner and jetted down the right sideline for 20 yards. It was one of the biggest plays of the Chiefs' Super Bowl IV win over the Minnesota Vikings, and it set up Jan Stenerud's third field goal of the game.

Pitts ran the reverse again in the third quarter and picked up a critical first down. Otis Taylor scored on the next play.

In 74 games for Kansas City, Pitts caught 78 passes for 11 touchdowns and ran the ball 24 times for 238 yards and one touchdown.

Cleveland and Oakland
The Chiefs traded Pitts to the Cleveland Browns before the start of the 1971 season, where he became one of their starting wide receivers.  He finished his career with the Oakland Raiders.

Personal life
Frank currently resides in Baton Rouge, Louisiana. Frank is married to Diane Guidry Pitts and they have three children.

His grandson, Brandon Bolden, played at Ole Miss and has spent the majority of his professional playing career with the New England Patriots.  However, Bolden is now a running back for the Las Vegas Raiders, joining his grandfather in playing for the Silver and Black.

See also
Other American Football League players

References 

1943 births
Living people
American football wide receivers
Kansas City Chiefs players
Cleveland Browns players
Oakland Raiders players
Southern Jaguars football players
Players of American football from Baton Rouge, Louisiana
Players of American football from Atlanta
American Football League players